Pseudonupserha wittei is a species of beetle in the family Cerambycidae. It was described by Stephan von Breuning in 1953. It is known from the Democratic Republic of the Congo.

References

Saperdini
Beetles described in 1953
Endemic fauna of the Democratic Republic of the Congo